The 1914–15 New Mexico Lobos men's basketball team represented the University of New Mexico during the 1914–15 NCAA college men's basketball season. The head coach was Ralph Hutchinson, coaching his fifth season with the Lobos.

Schedule

|-

References

New Mexico Lobos men's basketball seasons
New Mexico